North Ayrshire was a county constituency of the House of Commons of the Parliament of the United Kingdom from 1868 until 1918. It returned one Member of Parliament (MP), using the first-past-the-post voting system.

Boundaries

The Representation of the People (Scotland) Act 1868 provided that the new North Ayrshire constituency was to consist of the District of Cunningham, consisting of the parishes of Ardrossan, Dalry, Dreghorn, Fenwick, Irvine, Kilbirnie, Kilmarnock, Kilmaurs, Kilwinning, Largs, Loudoun, Stevenston, Stewarton, West Kilbride and Beith, and the parish of Dunlop so far as situated within the County of Ayr.

Members of Parliament

Election results

Elections in the 1860s

Elections in the 1870s

Elections in the 1880s

Elections in the 1890s

Elections in the 1900s

Elections in the 1910s

General Election 1914–15:

Another General Election was required to take place before the end of 1915. The political parties had been making preparations for an election to take place and by July 1914, the following candidates had been selected; 
Unionist: Duncan Campbell 
Liberal: Andrew Anderson

Chalmers was supported by the Union of Democratic Control and contested the 1918 general election as a Labour Party candidate.

See also
 Former United Kingdom Parliament constituencies

References

Historic parliamentary constituencies in Scotland (Westminster)
Constituencies of the Parliament of the United Kingdom established in 1868
Constituencies of the Parliament of the United Kingdom disestablished in 1918
Politics of Ayrshire